The Junior Eurovision Song Contest 2022 was the 20th edition of the annual Junior Eurovision Song Contest. Organised by the European Broadcasting Union (EBU) and host broadcaster Public Television Company of Armenia (AMPTV), the contest was held at the Karen Demirchyan Sports and Concerts Complex.

Sixteen countries participated in the contest.

's Lissandro was the winner of the contest with the song "". Meanwhile,  achieved their lowest placing to date.

Location 

The contest took place at the Karen Demirchyan Sports and Concerts Complex in Yerevan, the capital and largest city of Armenia. It was also the third consecutive time the contest is held in a capital city.

Bidding phase and host city selection 
Armenia's hosting had been confirmed by the EBU on 21 December 2021, following their win at the  two days before. Originally, unlike in the Eurovision Song Contest, the winning country did not receive the automatic rights to host the next contest. However, since , each contest has been hosted by the previous year's winning country. The venue was revealed on 17 February 2022 during a cabinet meeting of the Armenian government, where Prime Minister Nikol Pashinyan made the announcement. Pashinyan also mentioned that the government had allocated funds to the venue to prepare for the event. It was already reported earlier in that week that Yerevan would be the host city.

Format

Presenters 
Iveta Mukuchyan, Garik Papoyan and Karina Ignatyan were the presenters of the show. Ignatyan was the Armenian entrant in the Junior Eurovision Song Contest 2019, and Mukuchyan was the Armenian entrant in the Eurovision Song Contest 2016. The hosts were revealed on 18 November. Robin the Robot, a robot with artificial emotions developed by Armenian IT company Expper Technologies, was revealed as the guest presenter on 1 December. Robin was the first non-human host in Eurovision history.

Visual design 

The reveal of the contest's theme art had been delayed due to the September clashes between Armenia and Azerbaijan. In a press release, AMPTV stated that "preparations for the contest are ongoing, and according to the schedule, it was no longer possible to change the deadlines", while expressing hope that the contest will be held in peaceful conditions. The theme art and slogan for the contest, "Spin the Magic", was later revealed on 26 September 2022. The artwork features an Armenian-styled spinning top as the main motif.

Opening and interval acts 
The opening of the show featured the traditional flag parade, with all participants performing the common song "Spin the Magic". During the interval, Maléna performed her new single "Can’t Feel Anything", followed by Rosa Linn performing "Snap", with which she  in the Eurovision Song Contest 2022. Closing the interval, ten previous Junior Eurovision winners performed their winning songs, for the occasion of the 20th edition of the event, alongside Maléna: Bzikebi, Ralf Mackenbach, Vladimir Arzumanyan, Candy, Gaia Cauchi, Vincenzo Cantiello, Destiny Chukunyere, Mariam Mamadashvili, Viki Gabor, and Valentina. The other eight winning songs were performed by the Tavush Diocese Children’s Choir.

Postcards 
Contestants were featured in "postcard" video introductions, set in different locations across Armenia. Each began with a short clip of the upcoming performer using the Armenian-style spinning top on a particular piece of structure. Following that, a stream of light in the colours of the upcoming country's flag emanated from the structure and traveled to the Karen Demirchyan Sports and Concerts Complex, signalling the start of the upcoming performance.

  – Zvartnots Cathedral
  – Yerevan 2800th Anniversary Park
  – Republic Square
  – East entrance of the Republic Square metro station
  – Temple of Garni
  – Mother Armenia
  – One of the oldest houses near Hanrapetutyan Street, Yerevan
  – 50th Anniversary Monument to Soviet Armenia
  – A fountain in Republic Square
  – The Matenadaran
  – Cafesjian Center for the Arts
  – Monument to David of Sassoun
  – Yerevan Opera House
  – A fountain in the Yerevan 2800th Anniversary Park
  – Geghard Monastery
  – Yerevan Botanical Garden

Participating countries 

On 26 September 2022, the EBU announced that 16 countries would participate in the contest. After a 16-year hiatus, the  returned to the contest, with the British Broadcasting Corporation (BBC) replacing ITV, who previously organised the country’s participation in the contest between 2003 and 2005. Prior to the contest, the songs from each of the participating countries were featured on a compilation album titled Junior Eurovision Song Contest: Yerevan 2022, put together by the EBU and released on 30 November 2022 by Universal Music.

As the event began, the United Kingdom's Freya Skye was unable to sing live for the rehearsal that was filmed before the voting opened due to medical reasons, and playback was used. The issue continued into the jury show, where footage from the first rehearsal was used as a replacement. During the jury show, camera and in-ear device issues were reported for Serbia's Katarina Savić, who was allowed to perform again after the scheduled final performance of Ukraine's Zlata Dziunka. On the day of the contest, it was announced that Savić would not be performing live due to medical issues, and that footage from her jury show performance would be used instead.

's Lissandro was the winner of the contest with the song "".

Detailed voting results 

Below is a summary of all 12 points received from each country's professional juries.

Spokespersons 
The 12 points from the juries were announced live by a spokesperson from each country. Countries that did not provide their own spokesperson had their 12 points announced by a former winner or participant.

 Ralf Mackenbach
 Viki Gabor
 Hallash
 Gaia Cauchi
 Vincenzo Cantiello
 Valentina
 Mariam Gvaladze
 Niko Kajaia
 Holly Lennon
 Mariam Mamadashvili
 Juan Diego Álvarez
 Tabitha Joy
 Emily Alves
 Petar Aničić
 Maléna
 Mykola Oliinyk

Other countries 

For a country to be eligible for potential participation in the Junior Eurovision Song Contest, it needs to be an active member of the EBU.

Active EBU members 
 In January 2022, Eldar Rasulov, a member of Azerbaijani delegation, stated that the country must participate regardless where the contest is held in response to rumours that they would withdraw due to the upcoming contest being held in Armenia. However, the country ultimately did not appear on the final list of participants.
 In August 2022, German broadcaster NDR confirmed that they will not be participating in 2022 due to a "creative break" and partial travel warnings for Armenia issued by the Federal Foreign Office. NDR and KiKa would, however, still broadcast the contest, with a view of returning in 2023.
 In May 2022, Slovenian broadcaster RTVSLO initially stated that they were considering a return to the contest. However, the country did not end up participating.

Non-EBU members 
 Despite having initially confirmed their participation on 13 February 2022, all EBU members from Russia announced their withdrawal from the union on 26 February, in response to their exclusion from the Eurovision Song Contest 2022 due to the Russian invasion of Ukraine. On 26 May, the EBU made effective the suspension of its Russian members, causing Russia to indefinitely lose broadcasting and participation rights for future Eurovision events, including Junior Eurovision. The Russian selection process for the 2022 contest was therefore cancelled, with an alternative competition similar in format to Junior Eurovision, called , to be held in spring 2023.

Broadcasts

Viewing figures 
According to the EBU, 33 million people watched the Junior Eurovision Song Contest 2022, with a viewing share of 12.8% across 13 measured markets. Armenia had record high viewing figures for the contest, seeing 4 in 10 Armenians tune in to watch the contest. Other countries also saw their viewership increase; the Netherlands received 40% more viewers than in 2021, and Italy saw 100 times more viewers than in 2021. Poland delivered the biggest audience for the fourth year in a row.
For the following countries, viewership information is known:

See also 
 Eurovision Song Contest 2022
 Eurovision Young Musicians 2022

Notes and references

Notes

References

External links
 

 
2022
2022 song contests
December 2022 events in Armenia
21st century in Yerevan